The Sjögren Inertia Shotgun is a 12 gauge semi-automatic shotgun that was designed by the Swedish inventor Carl Axel Theodor Sjögren, initially manufactured by AB Svenska Vapen- och Ammunitionsfabriken in Sweden and then by Håndvåbenværkstederne Kjøbenhavn in Denmark. It used an inertia system later revived by the Italian firm Benelli and today widely used in shotguns.

A small number of semi-automatic military rifles in 7.62mm x 63 calibre were based on the Swedish Mauser using the Sjögren system, fed from internal seven round magazines, were also built, and tested by potential buyers, but found no market.

References

Sources 
 (1972). Guns Review (11).
 Marsh, Roger. (1947). "The Sjögren Shotgun and Sjögren Military Rifle". The Weapon Series (6).
 Peterson, Phillip. (2010). "Gun Collector’s Corner - Sjögren, The First 12-Gauge Auto". Gun Digest (11).
 Bates, James. (1977). "Sjögren Weapons - part I". The Gun Report (10).
 Bates, James. (1977). "Sjögren Weapons - part II". The Gun Report (11).

External links
 "Sjögren Automatic Rifles". Hansard, Volume 198. 10 December 1908
 material from Forgotten Weapons #1
 material from Forgotten Weapons #2
 https://www.guns.com/news/2012/06/16/forgotten-weapons-sjogren-shotgun-rifle
 Sjögren / Internet Movie Firearms Database (in films and video games)

Firearms of Norway
Semi-automatic shotguns
Weapons and ammunition introduced in 1909
1909 establishments in Denmark
Goods manufactured in Denmark
Firearms of Sweden